Sidewalks of New York is a 1923 American silent melodrama film directed by Lester Park and written by Willard King Bradley, based on the song by James W. Blake and Charles B. Lawlor.  The film stars Hanna Lee, Bernard Siegel, and Templar Saxe.

Cast list

References

Melodrama films
1920s English-language films
American silent feature films
American black-and-white films
1920s American films
Silent American drama films